Paap Ko Jalaakar Raakh Kar Doonga is a 1988 Hindi crime film. It stars Dharmendra, Govinda, Anita Raj, Farah in lead roles.

Plot 
Shankar Saxena lives with his elder brother, Chief Engineer Vinay, his wife Kavita, and their daughter of marriageable age, Pooja. Shankar is an undercover CBI Officer, a fact that was hidden from the rest of the family, until only recently. Vinay would like Pooja to marry Deepak Malhotra, who works in his office, and is quite unaware that Deepak and Pooja have already met and are very much in love. Although Deepak comes from a poor family, and lives with his widowed and blind mother, Vinay does not foresee this as a problem. Then suddenly things change dramatically when Vinay suspects Deepak of accepting bribes from a corrupt builder named Shaadilal, fires Deepak, pending a police investigation. And to make matters worse, Shankar too is aware of Deepak — not as a groom for his niece, but as a suspect for murder! But before he could arrest Deepak, he must execute a warrant for the arrest of none other than Vinay himself. Watch as events unfold enveloping this family in a web of deceit, intrigue, distrust, and terror.

Cast 

Dharmendra as Shankar Saxena
Govinda as Deepak Malhotra
Anita Raj as Vandana
Farah as Pooja 
Tanuja as Kavita Saxena
Kulbhushan Kharbanda as Vinay Saxena
Iftekhar as Inspector General of Police
Gita Siddharth as Mrs. Malhotra
Viju Khote as Doctor
Sadashiv Amrapurkar as Premanand
Shakti Kapoor as Shaadilal
Anupam Kher as Bhuchaal
Tej Sapru as Tejendra
Manik Irani as Raka

Music

External links 
 

1980s Hindi-language films
1980 films
Films scored by Ravindra Jain
1980s masala films